Ukrainian architecture has initial roots in the Eastern Slavic state of Kyivan Rus. After the 12th century, the distinct architectural history continued in the principalities of Galicia-Volhynia and later in Grand Duchy of Lithuania, Ruthenia and Žemaitia. During the epoch of the Zaporozhian Cossacks, a style unique to Ukraine developed under the influences of the Polish–Lithuanian Commonwealth.

After the union with the Tsardom of Russia, architecture in Ukraine began to develop in different directions, with many structures in the larger eastern, Russian-ruled area built in the styles of Russian architecture of that period, whilst the western Galicia was developed under Austro-Hungarian architectural influences. In both cases producing fine examples. Ukrainian national motifs would eventually be used during the period of the Soviet Union and in modern independent Ukraine.

Medieval Rus' (988–1230) 

The medieval state of Kyivan Rus was the predecessor of modern states of Ukraine, Russia, and Belarus and their respective cultures, including architecture.

The great church architecture, built after the adoption of Christianity in 988, were the first examples of monumental architecture in the East Slavic lands. The architectural style of the Kyivan state, which quickly established itself, was strongly influenced by the Byzantine. Early Eastern Orthodox churches were mainly made of wood, with the simplest form of church becoming known as a cell church. Major cathedrals often featured scores of small domes, which led some art historians to take this as an indication of the appearance of pre-Christian pagan Slavic temples.

Several examples of these churches survive to this day. However, in the course of the 16th–18th centuries, many were externally rebuilt in the Ukrainian Baroque style. Examples include the grand St. Sophia of Kyiv (the year 1017 is the earliest record of foundation laid), Church of the Saviour at Berestove (built from 1113 to 1125), and the St. Cyril's Church, c. 12th century. All can still be found in the Ukrainian capital.

Several buildings were reconstructed during the late 19th century, including the Assumption Cathedral in Volodymyr-Volynskyi, built in 1160 and reconstructed in 1896–1900, the Paraskevi church in Chernihiv, built in 1201 with reconstruction done in the late 1940s, and the Golden gates in Kyiv, built in 1037 and reconstructed in 1982. The latter's reconstruction was dismissed by some art and architecture historians as a revivalist fantasy.

Little secular or vernacular architecture of Kyivan Rus has survived.

Cossack epoch

Early Ukrainian Baroque 

Ukrainian Baroque emerged during the Hetmanate era of the 17th–18th centuries. Ukrainian  Baroque architecture, representative of cossack aristocracy, is distinct from Western European Baroque in that its designs were more constructivist, had more moderate ornamentation, and were simpler in form.

During the 17th-18th centuries, most medieval Rus' churches were significantly redesigned and expanded. Additional church domes and elaborate exterior and interior ornamentation were added.

Famous examples of Ukrainian Baroque architecture include the Kyiv Pechersk Lavra complex, the Vydubychi Monastery, and the Pochayiv Monastery.

 Small Cossack churches

Crimean Tatar architecture 

When Crimea was ruled by the Crimean Khanate, the period left several constructions inspired by Islamic motifs. The most famous was the Bakhchisaray Palace, designed by a combined effort of Persian, Turkish, and Italian architects.

Late Ukrainian Baroque 

 Sophia Cathedral reconstruction
 Kyiv Passenger Railway Station

Imperial period

Russian Empire 
As Eastern and Central Ukraine became increasingly integrated into the Russian Empire, Russian architects had the opportunity to realize their projects in the picturesque landscape that many Ukrainian cities and regions offered. St. Andrew's Church of Kyiv (1747–1754), built by Bartolomeo Rastrelli, is a notable example of Baroque architecture, and its location on top of the Kyivan mountain made it a recognizable monument of the city. An equally notable contribution of Rastrelli was the Mariinskyi Palace, which was built to be a summer residence to Russian Empress Elizabeth.

During the reign of the last Hetman of Ukraine, Kirill Razumovsky, many of the Cossack Hetmanate's towns such as Hlukhiv, Baturyn and Koselets had grandiose projects built by the appointed architect of Little Russia, Andrey Kvasov.

Russia, winning successive wars over the Ottoman Empire and its vassal Crimean Khanate, eventually annexed the whole south of Ukraine and Crimea. Renamed New Russia, these lands were to be colonized, and new cities such as the Nikolayev, Odessa, Kherson and Sevastopol were founded. These would contain notable examples of Imperial Russian architecture.

Austro-Hungarian Empire 
Western parts of Ukraine that were once part of the Austro-Hungarian empire host some prominent examples of 19th-century Central European architecture, such as the Lviv Theatre of Opera and Ballet.

Vernacular architecture 
The term vernacular architecture can be used interchangeably with the terms "folk", "common", "native", "traditional" and is usually placed at the other end of the spectrum from professionally designed building by architects. The building knowledge in vernacular architecture is based on local traditions and is thus based largely upon knowledge handed down through the generations. Different regions in Ukraine had their own distinctive style of vernacular architecture. For example, in the Carpathian Mountains and the surrounding foothills, wood and clay are the primary traditional building materials.

The Museum of Folk Architecture and Way of Life of Central Naddnipryanshchyna is located in Pereiaslav. The open-air museum contains 13 theme museums, 122 examples of national architecture, and over 30,000 historical cultural objects. The Museum of Decorative Finishes is one of the featured museums that preserves the handiwork of decorative architectural applications in Ukrainian architecture.

Galicia

Wooden churches in Western Ukraine

Architecture of late 19th and early 20th centuries

Eastern Ukraine 

 Ginzburg House
 House with Chimaeras
 Russo-Byzantium in Ukraine (St Volodymyr's Cathedral)

Western Ukraine 

 Historic Centre of Lviv - UNESCO World Heritage Site
 Chernivtsi University - UNESCO World Heritage Site
 Lviv Rail Terminal

Soviet Union 

After the October Revolution and the Russian Civil War that Ukraine was also involved in, most of the Ukrainian territory was incorporated into the new Communist Ukrainian SSR. For the first time, Ukrainians, as a nation became a recognized nationality, and as a result great efforts were undertaken to develop a separate Ukrainian architectural style.

Capital: Kharkiv (1917–1934) 

During the early years of the Soviet rule, the Ukrainization policies, meant that many Ukrainian architects were encouraged to use national motives unique to Ukraine. At the same time, architecture became standardised, all cities received general development plans to which they would be built. The national motives were, however, not taken up as the new architectural fashion for the new government became Constructivism.

In Soviet Ukraine, for the first 15 years, the capital was the eastern city of Kharkiv. Immediately a major project was developed to "destroy" its burgious-capitalist face and create a new Socialist one. A talented young architect Viktor Trotsenko, proposed a large central square with large modern buildings to become the central hub of the capital. Thus the Dzerzhinsky Square (now Freedom Square) was born, which would become the most brilliant example of constructivist architecture in the USSR and abroad. Enclosing a total of 11.6 ha, it is currently the third largest square in the world to date.

Of all, the most famous was the massive Gosprom building (1925–1928), which would become a symbol of not only Kharkiv, but Constructivism in general. Built by architects Sergei Serafimov, S. Kravets and M. Felger, and only in three years it would become the highest structure in Europe, and its unique feature lies in the symmetry which can only be felt at one point, in the centre of the square. As a tribute to the engineering design by Kharkiv's Technical University, none of the attempts to blow the building during the Second World War were successful, and it still remains the symbol of Kharkiv today.

Other examples on the square, however, were less fortunate. Such was the fate of the House of Projects (presently the Kharkiv University), which again was designed by Serafimov, built to symmetrise the Gosprom on the square's curvature, it too was a monumental achievement of constructivism. However, during the war it was seriously damaged and was rebuilt in a semi-Stalinist style that left little of the original building intact.

Capital: Kyiv (1934–1991) 

In 1934, the capital of Soviet Ukraine moved to Kyiv. During the preceding years, the city was seen as only a regional centre, and hence received little attention. All of that was to change, but at a great price. By this point, the first examples of Stalinist architecture were already showing and in light of the official policy, a new city was to be built on top of the old one. This meant that priceless examples such as the St. Michael's Golden-Domed Monastery were destroyed. Even the St. Sophia Cathedral was under threat.

However, the Second World War did not see the project realised. The surviving pre-war Kyivan constructions include the Building of the Central Committee of the Communist Party of Ukraine (presently occupied by the Ministry of Foreign Affairs). Built by architect, only the northern wing was completed, the identical and symmetrical southern wing to be built on the place of the destroyed monastery to house the Rada of Ministers was never completed. The other example is the Verkhovna Rada building built in 1936–38 by architect Volodymyr Zabolotny.

Following the heavy destruction of the Second World War, a new project for the reconstruction of central Kyiv was unveiled. This transformed the Khreshchatyk avenue into one of the finest examples of Stalinism in Architecture. A total of individual 22 projects were drawn up, when the initial competition began in 1944, none of which was realised due to extensive critique and finally in 1948 KyivProekt institute submitted its final version, headed by architects A. Vlasov and from 1949 Anatoly Dobrovolsky. For the next two decades, this figure would dominate all of the major projects in the capital.

Despite an enthusiastic start which saw most of the buildings such as the Post Office, City Council, the elegant white portico Conservatory, and the first buildings of the Kalinina Square, which were completed by 1955, the new politics of architecture once again promptly stopped the project from fully being realised.

Other examples in Soviet Ukraine 
 Reconstruction of Kharkiv
 Capital move to Kyiv
 DnieproGES

Stalinist period 

 Reconstruction of central Kyiv

Post-Stalinist period 

 Urban General plans
 Kyiv Palace of Sports, Palace "Ukrayina"

Modern Ukraine 

The language of modern architecture becomes more global and pluralistic in its artistic direction. At the same time, a significant role play new creative quests of progressive leanings, principles and approaches to solve the composition of the architectural form and style.

In the works of the Kyiv school of Ukrainian architects, postmodernism and high-tech tendencies can be increasingly found. This is a reflection of the globalization's reach across the world of architecture.

The task for modern Ukrainian architecture is diverse application of modern aesthetics, the search for an architect's own artistic style and inclusion of the existing historico-cultural environment.

Good examples of modern Ukrainian architecture include the reconstruction and renewal of the Maidan Nezalezhnosti in central Kyiv, despite the limit set by narrow space within the plaza, the engineers were able to blend together the uneven landscape and also use underground space to set a new shopping centre.

The major project that will take up most of the 21st century, is the construction of the Kyiv City-Centre on the Rybalskyi Peninsula, which, when finished, will include a dense skyscraper park amid the picturesque landscape of the Dnieper.

Specific examples

Metro 

During the Soviet Period, Metro stations were decorated with particularly vivid designs. The first three stations that were built by Ukrainian architects, were not actually located in Ukraine. Nonetheless, all three of them are considered to be the most iconic constructions ever achieved in history of underground construction. They are all known under one name Kyivskaya, and are located on the Moscow Metro under the Kiyevsky Rail Terminal.

In 1949, construction began on the first stage of the Kyiv Metro, which opened in 1960. All of the stations there are considered as monuments of architecture, due to their unique authentic character, that latter stations of the 1960s would lose in face of changing policy towards utilitarianism.

In 1967, construction began on the first stage of the Kharkiv Metro, which opened in 1975, this was soon joined by the semi-Metro Kryvyi Rih Metrotram in 1986 and the Dnipro Metro in 1995. Stations built in these systems, like most others in the former Soviet Union, have.

Seven Wonders of Ukraine 

On 24 August 2007, the Seven Wonders of Ukraine were announced. The initiator of this project is the people's representative to Supreme Council, Mykola Tomenko. The main goal of this enterprise is to direct the attention of the mass media and the citizens of the country to the most popular historical and cultural memorials of Ukraine.

The Seven Wonders of Ukraine is a logical extension of the set of projects under the motto 'Discover Ukraine!' that have taken place with the purpose to help discover Ukraine with its irreplaceable scenic sights, an interesting history, and rich recreational opportunities.

In 2008, another project took place under the name Seven Natural Wonders of Ukraine. It is a second stage of the main project Seven Wonders of Ukraine, which was primarily aimed at historical, cultural, and architectural sightings of the country. The second stage will identify the main geological objects such as rocks, mountain ridges, caves, lakes, rivers, natural woodlands.

This project as its predecessor also has three stages. First, after each Oblast introduces its nominees, 100 of those will move to the next stage. In the next three months, 21 winners of those hundred will be chosen for the final stage. And by the Independence Day, August 24, the final seven will be introduced to the public. The project is organized by the following institutions: the National Touristic Service of Ukraine, the Congressional Committee of youth policies, sport, and tourism, the national radio company of Ukraine, the ICTV telecompany, magazine Mandry, and many others.

See also 
 Architecture of Kyivan Rus
 Ukrainian Baroque
 List of UNESCO World Heritage Sites in Ukraine
 List of historic reserves in Ukraine

References

External links 
 Castle of Baron Steingel - Kyiv’s most romantic and enigmatic buildings in gothic style. A visit inside the castle. 2021-01-14.
Ukrainian Architecture Gallery 
 Sichynskyi's "Ukrainian Architecture" 
 Ministry of Foreign Affairs "Ukrainian Architecture 

 01